Cazoo is a British online car retailer based in London, England which was founded in 2018 by Alex Chesterman.

History
Cazoo was founded in 2018 by British internet entrepreneur Alex Chesterman. It launched an online marketplace for used cars in December 2019, which became its primary business.

It is based in the UK but listed on the New York Stock Exchange following a merger with a special-purpose acquisition company, led by hedge fund manager Dan Och in August 2021. As of its listing the company had a valuation of US$8 billion. It has since lost over 97% of its market value, causing Alex Chesterman to step down as CEO. 

In 2021 Cazoo expanded internationally, launching used car marketplaces in Germany and France, and in early 2022 expanding briefly into Italy and Spain.

After announcing redundancies in the UK in June 2022, in September 2022, Cazoo announced it would abandon its business in the European Union, closing its operations in France, Germany, Italy and Spain and making all 750 of its EU employees redundant, leaving only its UK operation in business.

Sponsorship
Cazoo currently sponsors Aston Villa, the Welsh Rugby Union, a number of annual horse races in Epsom and Doncaster, cricket tournament The Hundred, various events managed  by the World Snooker Tour, the PGA European Tour, and the Professional Darts Corporation. 

Consequent on the company's announced retrenchment to the UK market in September 2022, Cazoo's sponsorships of European football clubs for the 2022-23 season, including Olympique de Marseille, SC Freiburg, Valencia CF, Lille OSC, Bologna FC and Real Sociedad, are being wound down.

References

External links
 

Online automotive companies
Online retailers of the United Kingdom
British companies established in 2018
Retail companies established in 2018
Internet properties established in 2018
Privately held companies based in London
Used car market